Constant visual observation, often abbreviated to "constant visual", is a term used in various Mental Health Services, Prisons and Special Schools to describe the status of a prisoner or patient who poses a threat to himself or a third party, and must therefore be kept under constant observation.

There are essentially two levels of constant visual observations. The highest level, employed only for those patients who are considered to be extremely high risk to either themselves or a third party, involves a care worker remaining within arms reach of the service user at all times. The second level involves only maintaining a constant watch on a patient, sometimes from a distance.

Constant visual observations have been criticised by many service user groups.

See also
Panopticon

Penal imprisonment